Dutch Neck is the name of two places in the U.S. state of New Jersey:

 Dutch Neck, Cumberland County, New Jersey
 Dutch Neck, Mercer County, New Jersey